Alexis-Henri-Marie Lépicier O.S.M. (28 February 1863, Vaucouleurs, Meuse – 20 May 1936) was a Cardinal of the Roman Catholic Church who was Prefect of the Sacred Congregation for Religious. 

Lépicier was born in Vaucouleurs, France. He joined the Order of Servants of Mary on 1 March 1878 in London. He attended the Seminary of Saint-Sulpice Paris and the Pontifical Urban University "De Propaganda Fide" in Rome. He was ordained to the priesthood on 19 September 1885 in London. He served as Master of novices from 1890 until 1892 and was a faculty member of Pontifical Urbanian Athenaeum "De Propaganda Fide," from 1892 until 1913. He served as Rector of the Servite College, Rome from 1895 until 1913 and was General Procurator of his order in 1901. He was appointed Apostolic visitor and delegate to Scotland by Pope Pius X and was in Scotland in 1912–1913.

Episcopate 
He was appointed titular Archbishop of Tarsus on 22 May 1924. He was appointed as Apostolic Visitor to the East Indies dioceses dependent on the Congregation for the Propagation of Faith on 11 June 1924, as well as serving as Apostolic Visitor to Abyssinia and Eritrea in 1927.

Cardinal
He was created and proclaimed Cardinal-Priest of Santa Susanna in the consistory of 19 December 1927 by Pope Pius XI. He was then appointed as Prefect of the Sacred Congregation for Religious in 1928. He resigned the prefecture on the last day of 1935. He died in 1936.

References

1863 births
1936 deaths
People from Vaucouleurs
20th-century French cardinals
Members of the Congregation for Institutes of Consecrated Life and Societies of Apostolic Life